Farid Shawky (born 19 December 1989) is an Egyptian footballer who plays for Al Masry as a defensive midfielder.

References

1989 births
Living people
Egyptian footballers
Place of birth missing (living people)
Egyptian Premier League players
Association football midfielders
El Dakhleya SC players
Al Masry SC players